Robert M. Johnston may refer to:

Robert Mackenzie Johnston (1844–1918), Scottish-Australian statistician 
Robert Matteson Johnston (1867–1920), American historian
Robert Mercer Johnston (born 1908), a Canadian politician
Robert M. Johnston, co-author of "Elements of Applied Thermodynamics" with William A. Brockett